The seventh and final season of the American comedy drama television series Younger was released on Paramount+ between April 15 and June 10, 2021, comprising 12 episodes. The season was produced by Darren Star Productions and Jax Media, with Star serving as showrunner. Initially thought to be delayed until March 2021, filming began in October 2020 and wrapped in February 2021, when it was announced that the series was moving from TV Land to Paramount+. The first four episodes were made available altogether and the rest of the season debuted on a weekly basis.

Cast and characters

Main
 Sutton Foster as Liza Miller
 Debi Mazar as Maggie Amato
 Nico Tortorella as Josh
 Peter Hermann as Charles Brooks
 Molly Bernard as Lauren Heller
 Hilary Duff as Kelsey Peters

Recurring
 Miriam Shor as Diana Trout
 Laura Benanti as Quinn Tyler
 Charles Michael Davis as Zane Anders
 Michael Urie as Redmond
 Matt Passmore as Kai Manning
 Phoebe Dynevor as Clare
 Tessa Albertson as Caitlin Miller
 Janeane Garofalo as Cass Dekenessey
 Steven Good as Rob Davis

Guest
 Chris Tardio as Enzo de Luca
 Nadia Alexander as Fupa Grunhoff
 Kelli Barrett as Kamila
 Joanna Cassidy as Judith Clarke
 Ben Rappaport as Max Horowitz
 Mark Linn-Baker as Clive Wexler
 Jennifer Westfeldt as Pauline Turner-Brooks

Episodes

Production

Development 
TV Land announced the seventh season on July 24, 2019, making it the longest running original series in the network's history. In late 2020, series creator Darren Star was reached and announced that he was "unofficially planning [Season 7] as a final season." A spin-off series revolving on Liza's younger co-worker Kelsey Peters is in development, though it is unsure if the show will be produced by TV Land. The season will consist of 12 episodes, like the previous six. The series moved from TV Land to Paramount+ with the seventh and final season, which premiered on April 15, 2021, with the first four episodes available immediately and the rest debuting on a weekly basis.  However, TV Land will afterwards show the final season starting with the first two episode on July 7, 2021 and a new episode every Wednesday thereafter.

Casting 
The season stars Sutton Foster, Debi Mazar, Nico Tortorella, Hilary Duff, Molly Bernard, and Peter Hermann, reprising the roles from previous seasons. In January 2021, Tessa Albertson announced on Twitter that she had filmed her last scenes in the series, confirming her role as Liza's daughter, Caitlin Miller, in the seventh season. In March 2021, Miriam Shor, who portrays Diana Trout, and Charles Michael Davis, who portrays Zane Anderson, were demoted to the recurring cast from their main roles in all the previous seasons and the fifth and sixth seasons, respectively. In April 2021, Janeane Garofalo was cast in a recurring role for the final season.

Filming 
Filming was initially halted due to the COVID-19 pandemic, and was originally expected to begin in March 2020; however it began with only a small delay in mid-October 2020. Filming concluded after four months in mid-February 2021. After Duff finished filming her scenes for the entire series, Mazar posted a short tribute on Twitter about her, congratulating her for filming the season while being pregnant.

Reception 
The review aggregator website Rotten Tomatoes reported an approval rating of 100% and an average rating of 7.65/10 for the seventh season, based on 13 reviews. The website's critical consensus states, "A breezy, bittersweet farewell that captures everything that made the show so successful to begin with, Younger final chapter is one for the ages."

References

External links 

 Season 7 on IMDb

2021 American television seasons